Andre Agassi was the defending champion, but was defeated in the final to Pete Sampras with a score of 7–6(7–3), 7–6(7–1). By reaching the final, Sampras completed his 271st week at the world No. 1 ranking in his career, surpassing the previous record of 270 weeks 
established by Ivan Lendl.

Seeds

Draw

Finals

Top half

Bottom half

References

External links
 Official results archive (ATP)
 Official results archive (ITF)

Los Angeles Open (tennis)
2000 ATP Tour